Ab Garman (also Romanized as Āb Garmān; also known as Āb Garm) is a village in Berentin Rural District, Bikah District, Rudan County, Hormozgan Province, Iran. At the 2006 census, its population was 247, in 48 families.

References 

Populated places in Rudan County